Inducible T-cell costimulator is an immune checkpoint protein that in humans is encoded by the ICOS gene.

CD278 or ICOS (Inducible T-cell COStimulator) is a CD28-superfamily costimulatory molecule that is expressed on activated T cells. It is thought to be important for Th2 cells in particular.

Function 

The protein encoded by this gene belongs to the CD28 and CTLA-4 cell-surface receptor family. It forms homodimers and plays an important role in cell-cell signaling, immune responses and regulation of cell proliferation.

Knockout phenotype 

Compared to wild-type naïve T cells, ICOS-/- T cells activated with plate-bound anti-CD3 have reduced proliferation and IL-2 secretion. The defect in proliferation can be rescued by addition of IL-2 to the culture, suggesting the proliferative defect is due either to ICOS-mediated IL-2 secretion or the activation of similar signaling pathways between ICOS and IL-2. In terms of Th1 and Th2 cytokine secretion, ICOS-/- CD4+ T cell activated in vitro reduced IL-4 secretion, while maintaining similar IFN-g secretion. Similarly, CD4+ T cells purified from ICOS-/- mice immunized with the protein keyhole limpet hemocyanin (KLH) in alum or complete Freund's Adjuvant have attenuated IL-4 secretion, but similar IFN-g and IL-5 secretion when recalled with KLH.

These data are similar to an airway hypersensitivity model showing similar IL-5 secretion, but reduced IL-4 secretion in response to sensitization with Ova protein, indicating a defect in Th2 cytokine secretion, but not a defect in Th1 differentiation as both IL-4 and IL-5 are Th2-associated cytokines. In agreement with reduced Th2 responses, ICOS-/- mice expressed reduced germinal center formation and IgG1 and IgE antibody titers in response to immunization.

Combination therapy 

Ipilimumab patients expressed increased ICOS+ T cells in tumor tissues and blood. The increase served as a pharmacodynamic biomarker of anti-CTLA-4 treatment. In wild-type C57BL/6 mice, anti-CTLA-4 treatment resulted in tumor rejection in 80 to 90% of subjects, but in gene-targeted mice that were deficient for either ICOS or its ligand (ICOSLG), the efficacy was less than 50%. An agonistic stimulus for the ICOS pathway during anti-CTLA-4 therapy resulted in an increase in efficacy that was about four to five times as large as that of control treatments. As of 2015 antibodies for ICOS were not available for clinical testing.

References

Further reading

External links 
 
 

Clusters of differentiation